Philip Gibson Hodge Jr. (November 9, 1920 – November 11, 2014) was an American engineer who specialized in mechanics of elastic and plastic behavior of materials. His work resulted in significant advancements in plasticity theory including developments in the method of characteristics, limit-analysis, piecewise linear isotropic plasticity, and nonlinear programming applications. Hodge was the technical editor of American Society of Mechanical Engineers Journal of Applied Mechanics from 1971-1976. From 1984 to 2000 he was the secretary of the U. S. National Committee on Theoretical and Applied Mechanics, its longest serving Secretary. In 1949 he became assistant professor of Mathematics at UCLA, then moved on to become associate professor of applied mechanics at Polytechnic Institute of Brooklyn in 1953, Professor of Mechanics at Illinois Institute of Technology in 1957, and professor of mechanics at the University of Minnesota in 1971, where he remained until he retired in 1991.  After retirement he was professor emeritus at the University of Minnesota and visiting professor emeritus at Stanford University.

Education
Philip Hodge received a BA in mathematics from Antioch College in 1943.  During World War II, he joined the US Merchant Marine, where he served throughout the war. Upon his return he earned a PhD from Brown University in Applied Mathematics in 1949, where he was a student of William Prager.

Awards
 2000 - ASME Daniel C. Drucker Medal by the American Society of Mechanical Engineers
 1987 - ASME Medal by the American Society of Mechanical Engineers
 1985 - Theodore von Karman Medal by the American Society of Civil Engineers
 1984 - Distinguished Service Award by the American Academy of Mechanics
 1983 - Euler Medal by the USSR Academy of Sciences
 1975 - Worcester Reed Warner Medal by the American Society of Mechanical Engineers

Memberships and fellowships
 Member of the United States National Academy of Engineering elected in 1977

Books

Personal life
Married Thea D. Hodge (née Theresa E. Drell) in 1943 and they have three children: Susan Edith Hodge, Philip Tully Hodge, and Elizabeth Muriel Hodge Kelly.

Other Achievements
 1982 Twin Cities Marathon, Winner Master's Division Men 60-69

References

External links
 Personal Website: Philip Hodge's Personal Webpage: The Opera Nut
 Archive: University of Minnesota: Philip G Hodge Archive

1920 births
2014 deaths
American mechanical engineers
University of California, Los Angeles faculty
New York University faculty
Illinois Institute of Technology faculty
Stanford University faculty
University of Minnesota faculty
Brown University alumni
Antioch College alumni
United States Merchant Mariners
United States Merchant Mariners of World War II
Members of the United States National Academy of Engineering
ASME Medal recipients